Monument High School may refer to:

 Monument School in Monument, Oregon, United States
 Monument High School in Krugersdorp, South Africa